Daniel Wayne Armstrong is an American chemist who specializes in separation science, chiral molecular recognition, bioanalytic analysis, mass spectrometry and colloid chemistry. He is the Robert A. Welch Distinguished Professor at the University of Texas at Arlington. He has authored ~ 750 publications including 35 book chapters, a book, and holds over 35 patents on separation technologies. He was an associate editor for the prestigious American Chemical Society journal Analytical Chemistry. He is a fellow of the American Chemical Society, Royal Chemical Society (UK), and the National Academy of Inventors. Armstrong has given over 560 invited seminars worldwide at international conferences, universities and corporations. His research and patents formed the basis for two companies: Advanced Separation Technologies, Inc; which was acquires by Sigma-Aldrich Corporation in 2006 and AZYP, LLC in Arlington, TX.  His published work has been cited over 50,000 times and his h-index is 113. He is believed to have mentored more graduate level analytical chemists than any living scientist.

Biography 
Daniel W. Armstrong was born in 1949 to Robert E. Armstrong, an educator and mayor of Fort Wayne, IN and Nila L. Armstrong. He was the oldest of their three sons. As an undergraduate student, he played collegiate football and track & field.  He is married to Linda M. Armstrong and they have three children.

Early career 
Armstrong received his B.S. from Washington and Lee University. He received M.S. in Oceanography and Ph.D. in Bio-organic Chemistry from Texas A&M University. Armstrong began his career at Bowdoin College as an Assistant Professor in 1978 and moved to Georgetown University in 1980, followed by Texas Tech University and then the University of Missouri Rolla as a Curators Distinguished Professor. Later he joined Iowa State University in 2000 as the first Caldwell Distinguished Professor. He joined University of Texas at Arlington in 2006 as the Robert A. Welch Distinguished Professor, where he currently leads a research group in diverse areas of Chiral molecular recognitions, ionic liquids, separation mechanism and theory, ultra-fast analysis, D-amino acid and peptide analysis and gas and liquid chromatography instrumentation and detectors.

Awards and recognition
 Elected as a member of the Chemistry Honor Society, Phi Lambda Upsilon (PLU), 1975, Texas A&M University 
 Who's Who, Who's Who in the South and Southwest
 Personalities of America
 Personalities of the South
 American Men and Women of Science
 Directory of World Researchers
 Who's Who in the Midwest 
 1985 - Teaching Excellence Award from the "Arts and Sciences Council" of Texas Tech University
 1988 - Faculty Excellence Award, University of Missouri-Rolla, 1988.  
 1988-1994 Teaching Excellence Award, University of Missouri-Rolla
 1989 - Curators' Distinguished Professorship  
 1990 - EAS Award for Outstanding Achievements in the Fields of Chromatography 
 1991 - Great Britain’s Martin Medal in recognition of outstanding contributions to Chromatography.  
 1992 - ISCO Lectureship Award for Significant Contributions to Instrumentation for Biochemical Separations.  
 1993 - 49th American Chemical Society Midwest Regional Award.  
 1993 - Presidential Award for Research and Creativity.  
 1994 - Publication entitled "Evaluation of the Macrocyclic Antibiotic Vancomycin as a Chiral Selector for Capillary Electrophoresis" received a 1994 Perkin-Elmer Award for Excellence in Capillary Electrophoresis.  
 1995 - R&D 100 Award.  
 1995 - American Association of Pharmaceutical Scientists Fellow Award.  
 1996 - The American Microchemical Societies’ A. A. Benedette-Pichler Award.  
 1997 - Karen Morehouse Best Paper Award” presented by the 12th Annual Conference on Hazardous Waste Research.  
 1998 - American Chemical Society - Helen M. Free Award for Public Outreach.  
 1999 - American Chemical Society Award in Chromatography.  
 1999 - Distinguish Scholar, Hope College/Park Davis. 
 2000 - Caldwell Chair, Iowa State University.  
 2001 - Chicagoland Chromatography Discussion Group (CCDG) Merit Award
 2001 - Weber Medal for Contributions to Pharmaceutical Science 
 2001 - Honorary Member of the Societatis Pharmaceuticae Slovacae
 2002 - Welch Lectureship speaker, Texas A&M University  
 2002 - Kenneth A. Spencer Award for Meritorious Contributions to Agricultural and Food Chemistry. 
 2003- Dow Lectureship in Chemistry, University of British Columbia  
 2003- IAP Lectureship, Columbia University, NY
 2003- Chirality Medal, Shizuoka, Japan  
 2004 - Vladimir J. Zuffa Medal for Pharmaceutical Chemistry
 2005 - Dal Nogare Award for Separation Science
 2006 - R. A. Welch Chair, University of Texas at Arlington
 2007 - Medal of the Slovak Medical Society
 2009 - Admitted as a Fellow of The Royal Society of Chemistry
 2012 - UTA Distinguished Record of Research or Creative Activity  
 2013 - Named American Chemical Society Fellow, 2013.  
 2014 - ACS Award for Separation Science & Technology
 2014 - M.J.E. Golay Award.  
 2014 - Elected a Fellow of National Academy of Inventors
 2014 - UT Arlington Distinguished Scholars Award
 2014 - Inducted to the UTA Academy of Distinguished Scholars
 2015 - Named  to the Analytical Scientist’s 2015  Power List Top 10
 2015 - Wilfred T. Doherty Research & Service Award – DFW Section of American Chemical Society
 2017 - Named to the Analytical Scientist's 2017 Power List Top 10
 2018 - Received Dow Chemical WesTEC Award for "Distinguished Leader in Science and Technology"
 2018 - Granted a Doctor Honoris Causa Degree from Slovak University of Technology 
 2018 - UT Arlington Excellence in Teaching Award
 2019 - Named to the Analytical Scientist's 2019 Power List Top 20
 2020 - LCGC Lifetime Achievement Award

References

External links 
Daniel W. Armstrong at ResearchGate
Daniel W. Armstrong at Google Scholar

21st-century American chemists
Living people
Missouri University of Science and Technology faculty
University of Texas at Arlington faculty
Year of birth missing (living people)